The canton of Saint-Laurent-du-Maroni (French: Canton de Saint-Laurent-du-Maroni) is one of the former cantons of the Guyane department in French Guiana. It was located in the arrondissement of Saint-Laurent-du-Maroni. Its administrative seat was located in Saint-Laurent-du-Maroni, the canton's sole commune. Its population was 40,597 in 2012.

Administration

References 

Saint-Laurent-du-Maroni